The Missouri Militia is a private militia in the U.S. state of Missouri. The Missouri Militia is not a part of the Missouri State Defense Force. which is the state defense force for the state of Missouri. 

The Missouri Militia is distinct from the state's National Guard in that they are not associated with or funded by the state or federal governments. Its members have been active in disaster relief after the 2011 Joplin tornado.

References

Militia in the United States
Survivalism in the United States
Right-wing militia organizations in the United States
Paramilitary organizations based in the United States
1982 establishments in Missouri